Lesbian, gay, bisexual, and transgender (LGBT) people in  Oman face legal challenges not experienced by non-LGBT residents. Homosexuality in the Sultanate of Oman is illegal according to §§, 33 and 223 of the penal code and can be punished with a prison sentence up to three years. In Oman, it is said that cases only get to court if "public scandal" is involved.

Living conditions

In September 2013, it was announced that all Gulf Cooperative Countries had agreed to discuss a proposal to devise a "gay test" intended to single out gay foreigners and prevent them from entering any of the countries. However, it has been suggested that concern for hosting 2022 FIFA World Cup in Qatar, and fears for controversy in a case that football fans would have been screened, made officials backtrack the plans and insist that it was a mere proposal.

LGBT rights movement in Oman 
Like in other Gulf countries, advocacy for LGBT rights in Oman is a criminal act, activists use social media with an alias to protect their identities with very rare exceptions.

Summary table

See also 
 Human rights in Oman
 LGBT rights in Asia
 LGBT in the Middle East

References

Politics of Oman
Human rights in Oman
Oman
Oman
Gender in Oman